Olympique Lyonnais, commonly referred to as simply Lyon or OL, is a men and women's French professional football club based in Lyon in Auvergne-Rhône-Alpes. The men play in France's highest football division, Ligue 1. Founded in 1950, the club won its first Ligue 1 championship in 2002, starting a national record-setting streak of seven successive titles. Lyon has also won eight Trophées des Champions, five Coupes de France, and three Ligue 2 titles.

Lyon has participated in the UEFA Champions League seventeen times, and during the 2009–10 season, reached the semi-finals of the competition for the first time after three previous quarter-final appearances. They once again reached this stage in the 2019–20 season. Olympique Lyonnais plays its home matches at the 59,186-seat Parc Olympique Lyonnais, commercially known as the Groupama Stadium, in Décines-Charpieu, a suburb of Lyon. The club's home colors are white, red and blue. Lyon was a member of the G14 group of leading European football clubs and are founder members of its successor, the European Club Association.

The club's nickname, Les Gones, means "The Kids" in Lyon's regional dialect of Franco-Provençal. They have a long-standing rivalry with nearby club Saint-Étienne, with whom they contest the Derby Rhône-Alpes. Lyon had been owned by Jean-Michel Aulas since 1987, before American businessman John Textor completed the purchase of the club in December 2022.

History

Olympique Lyonnais was initially formed under the multisports club Lyon Olympique Universitaire, which was originally formed in 1896 as Racing Club de Lyon. Following numerous internal disagreements regarding the cohabitation of amateurs and professionals within the club, then-manager of the club Félix Louot and his entourage contemplated forming their own club. On 3 August 1950, Louot's plan came to fruition when Olympique Lyonnais was officially founded by Dr. Albert Trillat and numerous others. The club's first manager was Oscar Heisserer and, on 26 August 1950, played its first official match defeating CA Paris-Charenton 3–0 in front of 3,000 supporters. In just the club's second year of existence, Lyon was crowned champion of the second division, securing promotion to the first division. The club maintained its first division place for the remainder of the decade, excluding a year's stint in the second division for the 1953–54 season.

Lyon achieved moderate success during the 1960s and 1970s with the likes of Fleury Di Nallo, Néstor Combin, Serge Chiesa, Bernard Lacombe and Jean Djorkaeff playing major roles. Under manager Lucien Jasseron, Lyon won its first-ever Coupe de France title defeating Bordeaux 2–0 in the 1963–64 season. The club also performed respectably in the league under Jasseron's reign until the 1965–66 season, when Lyon finished 16th, which ultimately led to Jasseron's departure. His replacement was Louis Hon, who helped Lyon win their second Coupe de France title after defeating Sochaux 3–1 in the 1966–67 season.
Lyon was managed by former Lyon legend Aimé Mignot heading into the 1970s. Under Mignot's helm, Lyon won its third Coupe de France title in 1972–73, beating Nantes 2–1.

In June 1987, Lyon was bought by Rhône businessman Jean-Michel Aulas who took control of the club aiming to turn Lyon into an established Ligue 1 side. His ambitious plan, titled OL – Europe, was designed to develop the club at the European level and back into the first division within a period of no more than four years. The first manager under the new hierarchy was Raymond Domenech. The aspiring chairman gave Domenech carte blanche to recruit whoever he saw fit to help the team reach the first division. They went on to accomplish this in Domenech's first season in charge. Lyon achieved its zenith under Domenech when it qualified for the UEFA Cup. For the remainder of his tenure, however, the club underachieved. Domenech was replaced by former French international Jean Tigana, who led the team to an impressive second place in the 1994–95 season.

At the start of the new millennium, Lyon began to achieve greater success in French football. The club established itself as the premiere club in France defeating Marseille and Paris Saint-Germain and also became France's richest club. Lyon became known for developing promising talent who went on to achieve greatness not only in France, but also abroad and internationally. Notable examples include Michael Essien, Florent Malouda, Sidney Govou, Juninho, Cris, Eric Abidal, Mahamadou Diarra, Patrick Müller and Karim Benzema. Lyon won its first ever Ligue 1 championship in 2002, starting a national record-breaking streak of seven successive titles. During that run the club also won one Coupe de France title, its first Coupe de la Ligue title and a record six Trophée des Champions. The club also performed well in UEFA competitions, reaching as far as the quarter-finals on three occasions and the semi-finals in 2010 in the UEFA Champions League. Lyon's streak and consistent dominance of French football came to an end during the 2008–09 season, when it lost the title to Bordeaux.

OL has begun investment in sports outside of football. OL operates an esports team in China, and in 2019 purchased a minority stake in the local ASVEL basketball club, specifically purchasing a 25% interest in ASVEL's men's side and a 10% interest in the women's side.

More recently, OL announced in December 2019 that it would buy an 89.5% stake in the U.S. National Women's Soccer League team known at the time as Reign FC. The purchase closed in January 2020 following approval of the NWSL board. Several weeks later, OL announced the rebranding of Reign FC as OL Reign.

In the 2019–20 season, Lyon suffered a poor start to the season, and ended the season in seventh place, as the league was cancelled due to the coronavirus outbreak. Lyon also reached the final of the Coupe de la Ligue, however, they eventually lost to Paris Saint-Germain 6–5 on penalties. Ultimately, this meant that Lyon failed to qualify for European competition for the first time in 24 years. In the Champions League, Lyon were more successful, defeating Juventus in the round of 16 and Manchester City in the quarter-final to reach the semi-finals for the first time in 10 years. However, they eventually lost 3–0 in the semi-final to Bayern Munich, eliminating Lyon from the competition.

Ownership and finances

Olympique Lyonnais was owned by Rhône businessman Jean-Michel Aulas, who acquired the club on 15 June 1987. He serves as the founder and chief operating officer of CEGID (Compagnie Européenne de Gestion par l'Informatique Décentralisée). After ridding the club of its debt, Aulas restructured the club's management and reorganised the finances and, in a span of two decades, transformed the club from a second division team into one of the richest football clubs in the world. However, Aulas has been lambasted by critics for running the club as if it were a business. During this period, the club operated on the European Stock Exchange under the name OL Groupe, initialled OLG. Aulas currently serves on the board for the European Club Association, a sports organisation representing football clubs in Europe. He was also the last president of the now-defunct G-14 organisation.

In April 2008, business magazine Forbes ranked Lyon as the thirteenth most valuable football team in the world. The magazine valued the club at $408 million (€275.6M), excluding debt. In February 2009, Lyon were rated in the 12th spot in the Deloitte Football Money League, reportedly bringing in an annual revenue of €155.7 million for the 2007–08 season, which ranks among the world's best football clubs in terms of revenue.

In 2016, a Chinese private equity fund acquired 20% stake in Olympique Lyonnais Group for €100 million. The fund was managed by IDG Capital Partners. 

In December 2022, American businessman John Textor completed the purchase of the club, owning 77.49% of the club's shares and thus becomes the new owner of the club. Under this arrangement, Aulus continues to serve as president for at least three more seasons.

As of 24 February 2023.

Stadium

Olympique Lyonnais used to play at the Stade de Gerland since 1950, the year of the club's foundation. In 1910, the mayor of Lyon, Édouard Herriot, came up with the idea to develop and build a sports stadia with an athletics track and a velodrome in the city. In 1912, the stadium was officially mandated and local architect Tony Garnier was given the reins to designing and constructing it. Construction began in 1914 with hopes that the stadia would be completed before the International Exhibition of 1914. Due to World War I, however, construction was temporarily halted, but resumed following its conclusion in 1919. By 1920, the stadium was completely functional. In 1926, the Stade de Gerland was inaugurated by Herriot.

Olympique Lyonnais began playing at the Gerland in 1950 and remained at the stadium until 2016. The stadia originally had a cycling track, but was removed to increase the seating capacity to 50,000. In 1984, minor renovations were made to the stadium by architect Rene Gagis. This included construction of the Jean Bouin and Jean Jaurès stands. Further renovations were needed to prepare the stadium for the 1998 FIFA World Cup, as by that time FIFA had mandated that all stadiums used for international matches, including the World Cup, had to be all-seated. The north and south stands, known as the Jean Jaurès and Jean Bouin stand, respectively, were completely knocked down and rebuilt, and the athletics track that had remained, even after the cycling track had been removed, was taken out. The renovations were done by architect Albert Constantin. The new incarnation of Gerland had a maximum capacity of 40,500.

On 1 September 2008, Olympique Lyonnais president Jean-Michel Aulas announced plans to create a new 60,000-seat stadium, tentatively called OL Land, to be built on 50 hectares of land located in Décines-Charpieu, a suburb of Lyon. The stadium includes state-of-the-art sporting facilities, two hotels, a leisure center and commercial and business offices.

On 13 October 2008, the project was agreed upon by the State, the General Council of Rhône, the Grand Lyon, SYTRAL and the municipality of Décines for construction with approximately €180 million of public money being used and between €60–80 million coming from the Urban Community of Lyon. After the announcement, however, the club's efforts to get the stadium off the ground were hindered mainly due to slow administrative procedures, political interests and various opposition groups, who viewed the stadium as financially, ecologically and socially wrong for the taxpayers and community of Décines. The official name of the stadium was provisionally to be The Stade des Lumières.

On 22 September 2009, French newspaper L'Equipe reported that OL Land had been selected by the French Football Federation (FFF) as one of the 12 stadiums to be used in the country's bidding for UEFA Euro 2016. The FFF officially made their selections on 11 November 2009 and the city of Lyon was selected as a site to host matches during the tournament.

The opening of Parc OL was on 9 January 2016. Olympique Lyonnais beat Troyes 4–1 with goals from Alexandre Lacazette, Rachid Ghezzal, Jordan Ferri and Claudio Beauvue.

Training centre

The Centre Tola Vologe was the training centre and club headquarters of Olympique Lyonnais before the move to their new stadium in 2016. It is located in the city of Lyon, not far from the Stade de Gerland. The facility is named after Anatole Vologe, commonly called Tola Vologe, who was a Lyon sportsman and was murdered by the Gestapo during World War II. The facility is known for its high-level training and several prominent players have passed through the youth training centre. These include Karim Benzema, Hatem Ben Arfa, Sidney Govou, Alexandre Lacazette, Samuel Umtiti and Ludovic Giuly. The centre used to host training sessions for the senior team and also served as the home facility for the club's reserve, youth (both male and female), and female sides, who both played their home matches at the Plaine des Jeux de Gerland. Jean-François Vulliez is the current director of the centre.

Both the men and women teams now train within a modern complex right by the new Groupama Stadium in Décines. The youth Academy also moved to the neighbouring town of Meyzieu.

Colours and kits

Since the club's foundation, the primary colours have been red, blue, and white, with the latter being the most predominant of the three. During the early years of the club's existence, Olympique Lyonnais primarily played in all-white uniforms. In 1955, Lyon officials decided to add a red and blue chevron and blue shorts to the combination. In 1961, the chevron tradition was disbanded and the two strips of red and blue were shaped horizontally. After six years, the club returned to the all-white uniforms, but kept intact the red and blue stripes, but, instead of keeping them horizontally, inserted them vertically and on the left side of the shirt. Lyon began wearing the shirt during the 1970–71 season and wore the kits up until the 1975–76 season. For the 2002–03 season, chairman Jean-Michel Aulas announced that the club would return the kits. Lyon wore them, with several different modifications every year, for six of their seven consecutive titles.

In 1976, the club endured a drastic change to their kits, ditching the all-white uniforms for an all-red style, akin to English club Liverpool. The club wore the kits up until the 1989–90 season, with the 1977–78 and 1978–79 seasons being excluded due to the club adding navy blue vertical stripes to the shirt that was deemed unsuccessful. Following the 1989–90 season, the club returned to the all-white kits and, at the start of the 1995–96 season, the club returned the vertical stripes, but opted to insert them in the center of the shirt, instead of to the left. The club kept this style until the 2001–02 season. For the 2009–10 season, Lyon returned the horizontal red and blue stripes. In the Champions League, Lyon has used a variety of different colours as first choice, including red, navy blue, light blue, black, silver and fluorescent yellow.

Supporters

Olympique Lyonnais has an active fanbase composed of many groups of supporters. One of the club's most notable supporters group is Bad Gones ("Bad Kids"). The Bad Gones were established in 1987 around the time of Jean-Michel Aulas's purchase of the team and occupy the Virage Nord area of the Stade de Gerland. During the 2007–08 season, the group celebrated its 20th anniversary. The Bad Gones is the biggest group of supporters in France and have a very strong reputation in Europe, due to the club's control of Ligue 1, as well as Lyon's continued appearances in the UEFA Champions League.

Another notable supporters group is the Cosa Nostra Lyon, who occupy the Virage Sud area of the stadium. The group was created in 2007 as a result of a merger between two groups, the Lugdunums, which had existed since 1993 and Nucleo Ultra, which formed in 2000. The merger was created to achieve a sense of stability among supporters. The group is no longer recognised by the club, but continues to operate in a functional manner. Other support groups include the Hex@gones, which was formed in 2000 and sit in the Virage Sud area, the Gastrogones, who occupy the Jean Bouin stand, and the O'Elles Club, who sit in the Jean Jaurès stand.

The club also has support groups that are based in areas outside of the city of Lyon. The Gones 58 supporters come from the department of Nièvre in Bourgogne, while Gones 26 origins come from the department of Drôme in nearby Valence. Three minor support groups in Septimagones, Loups Marchois, and Dauphigones comes from the commune of Hérépian, the department of Creuse, and the department of Isère, respectively.

Statistics and records

Lyon's first competitive game was a 3–0 victory against CA Paris-Charenton on 26 August 1950. Since the club's foundation in 1950, they have played 48 seasons in France's highest football division, which totals 1,768 matches. Of the 1,768, they achieved 686 victories, drew 442 matches and lost 602 contests. Of the nine seasons the club played in Ligue 2, they contested 310 matches, winning 160 matches, drawing 84 times and losing only 56. Lyon achieved their 1,000th victory during the 2003–04 season after defeating Strasbourg.

The Moroccan-born French midfielder Serge Chiesa holds Lyon overall appearance record having played in 541 matches over the course of 14 seasons from 1969 to 1983. Following him is former goalkeeper Grégory Coupet who contested 518 matches over the course of 11 seasons from 1997 to 2008. Along with Sidney Govou, Coupet also has the distinction of being the only player in Lyon's history to win all four domestic French titles having been a part of all seven Ligue 1 titles, the club's Coupe de France triumph in 2008, the only Coupe de la Ligue win in 2001, and six of the seven Trophée des Champions titles. Govou, Coupet, and Juninho share the honour of being only Lyon players who were a part of all seven title runs.

The club's all-time leading scorer is Fleury Di Nallo, who scored 182 goals while at the club from 1960 to 1974. Di Nallo is also third behind Chiesa and Coupet in all time appearances having played in 489 matches during his 14-year stint at the club. Despite Di Nallo's impressive goalscoring record, he doesn't hold the record for most goals scored during a league season. That distinction was held by Bourg-en-Bresse-born André Guy who notched 25 goals, which he attained in the 1968–69 season. Alexandre Lacazette, however, scored his 26th goal of the 2014–15 league season in an important game away to Stade de Reims when he scored in the sixth minute.

Lyon's biggest victory is 10–0, which occurred of two occasions against Ajaccio in the 1953–54 edition of the Coupe de France and, two seasons later, against Delle in the 1955–56 edition of the competition. Lyon's biggest league victory is 8–0 and also occurred on two occasions. The first being during the 1966–67 season against Angers and the second being against Marseille during the 1997–98 season. The club's biggest victory on the European stage occurred during the 1974–75 season, where Lyon hammered Luxembourg-based club FA Red Boys Differdange 7–0.

Rivalries

Historically, Lyon has had a healthy rivalry with Saint-Étienne, head-to-head clashes between the clubs being referred to as the Derby Rhône-Alpes. Since the club's dominance at the start of the new millennium, however, they have established rivalries with Marseille, Bordeaux, Paris Saint-Germain and Lille. Lyon also share minor rivalries with fellow Rhône-Alpes clubs Grenoble and AS Lyon Duchère.

The Saint-Étienne rivalry began during the 1960s when Lyon established permanent residency in the French first division. The Arpitan rivalry stems from both clubs close proximity of each other, separated by just , as well as historical social and cultural difference between the two cities where they are based; Lyon cited as being more upper-class, while Saint-Étienne is cited as being more working-class. The derby also pits "the recently most successful French club" (Lyon) against "the formerly biggest French club" (Saint-Étienne) and is often cited as one of the high-points of the Ligue 1 season.

Lyon's rivalry with Marseille goes back to 23 September 1945, when the clubs contested their first match. The derby, often called Choc des Olympiques ("Clash of the Olympics") or Olympico, is often cited as being particularly important as both clubs are of high standard in French football and the championship is regularly decided between the two. Marseille, Saint-Étienne, Lyon, and PSG are the only French clubs to have won the French first division four straight times with Marseille doing it on two occasions.

Sponsors
On 7 August 2009, Lyon announced that it would sign a ten-year deal with the German sportswear brand Adidas, effective at the start of the 2010–11 season with Lyon earning €5 million annually from the deal, plus possible royalty fees based on product sales.

Following the 2008–09 season, Lyon's long-term sponsorship agreement with the French multinational corporation Accor and Renault Trucks ended. On 22 July 2009, the Paris-based online bookmaker BetClic reached an agreement with Lyon to advertise on the club's kits. Due to French law prohibiting online gambling, however, Lyon could not wear its kits displaying the BetClic logo. On 12 August 2009, just before the opening league match against Le Mans, the club was relieved of its BetClic-sponsored shirts by the Ligue de Football Professionnel (LFP), which warned the club that it risked forfeiting points if the club wore them. Lyon complied and, since the Le Mans match, wore sponsorless shirts while playing on French soil. Lyon were free to wear its BetClic sponsored shirts outside France; on 25 August 2009, the club unveiled the shirts in Belgium while taking on Anderlecht in the Champions League. On 15 January 2010, Lyon secured a sponsorship agreement with Japanese video game company Sony Computer Entertainment to display the company's PlayStation logo on their shirts. The deal lasted until the end of the 2009–10 season. In 2010, the French ban on online gambling advertising was lifted and Lyon began wearing its BetClic-sponsored shirts on French soil. In August 2012, the club agreed a two-year sponsorship deal with Korean car manufacturers Hyundai that would start in 2012–13 season, replacing BetClic as the main sponsor in their shirts for Ligue 1 matches.

Minor sponsors of the club include LG, APICIL, and MDA Électroménager. During Coupe de France matches, the club wear kits sponsored by SFR, Caisse d'Épargne and Pitch as they are main sponsors of the FFF. During Coupe de la Ligue matches, Lyon wear shirts with the Speedy Triangle logo on the front of their shirt, as they are main sponsors of the LFP.

Media
On 27 July 2005, the club launched the 24/7 network OL TV, which is completely devoted to club programming and events, along with reserve and women's team matches.

Kit suppliers and shirt sponsors

 In seasons where there are multiple shirt sponsors, a different sponsor would appear for corresponding kits, e.g. home, away, and alternate kits.

UEFA club coefficient ranking

Players

Current squad
As of 3 February 2023

Out on loan

Reserve squad

Former players
For a complete list of former Olympique Lyonnais players with a Wikipedia article, see here.

Numbers of honour

16 –  retired in 1999 in recognition of goalkeeper Luc Borrelli. Borrelli was killed in a road accident in February of that year. In 2011, the number was brought out of retirement and given to back-up goalkeeper Anthony Lopes.

17 –  retired in 2003 in recognition of midfielder Marc-Vivien Foé. Foé died while playing for Cameroon in the 2003 FIFA Confederations Cup at the Stade de Gerland, Lyon. The number was brought out of retirement in 2008 to allow Cameroonian player Jean Makoun to wear it. Following Makoun's departure, the number went without use for a year. In 2011, it was given to Alexandre Lacazette.

Award winners
UNFP Player of the Year
The following players have won the UNFP Player of the Year while playing for Lyon:
 Michael Essien – 2005
 Juninho – 2006
 Florent Malouda – 2007
 Karim Benzema – 2008
 Lisandro López – 2010
 Alexandre Lacazette – 2015

UNFP Young Player of the Year
The following players have won the UNFP Young Player of the Year while playing for Lyon:
 Florian Maurice – 1995
 Sidney Govou – 2001
 Hatem Ben Arfa – 2008
 Nabil Fekir – 2015

UNFP Goalkeeper of the Year
The following player have won the UNFP Goalkeeper of the Year while playing for Lyon:
 Grégory Coupet – 2003, 2004, 2005, 2006
 Hugo Lloris – 2009, 2010, 2012

Bravo Award
The following players have won the Bravo Award while playing for Lyon:
 Karim Benzema – 2008

Coaches

Olympique Lyonnais has had 22 permanent coaches and two caretaker coaches since the club's first appointed Oscar Heisserer as a professional coach in 1950. Heisserer also served as the first player-coach of the club, coming out of retirement to play during his final season at the club. The longest-serving coach in terms of time was Aimé Mignot, who coached Lyon for eight years from 1968 to 1976. Alain Perrin, who coached the club from 2007 to 2008, was the first Lyon coach to achieve the double.

Current coaching staff
As of 24 February 2023.

Olympique Lyonnais women

Olympique Lyonnais Féminin currently play in France's top division, Division 1 Féminine. The ladies team was set up in the 1970s as part of FC Lyon, but was attached to OL in the summer of 2004. They mostly play their home games at Groupama OL Training Center, 200 metres from Parc Olympique Lyonnais, the main stadium.

Honours

Honours

Lyon has won Ligue 1 seven times, which ranks sixth in French football history. Lyon has the distinction of starting a national record-breaking streak of seven successive titles beginning with the 2001–02 season. The club has also been crowned champions of Ligue 2 three times, won five Coupe de France titles, one Coupe de la Ligue title and eight Trophée des Champions. Though the club is a regular participant in the UEFA Champions League, they have only reached as far as the semi-finals, which was accomplished during the 2009–10 and 2019–20 seasons. Lyon has won the UEFA Intertoto Cup, achieving this honour in 1997.

Domestic

League
Ligue 1
Winners (7): 2001–02, 2002–03, 2003–04, 2004–05, 2005–06, 2006–07, 2007–08
Runners-up (5): 1994–95, 2000–01, 2009–10, 2014–15, 2015–16

Ligue 2
Winners (3): 1950–51, 1953–54, 1988–89

Cups
Coupe de France
Winners (5): 1963–64, 1966–67, 1972–73, 2007–08, 2011–12
Runners-up (3): 1962–63, 1970–71, 1975–76

Coupe de la Ligue
Winners (1): 2000–01
Runners-up (5): 1995–96, 2006–07, 2011–12, 2013–14, 2019–20

Trophée des Champions
Winners (8): 1973, 2002, 2003, 2004, 2005, 2006, 2007, 2012
Runners-up (4): 1967, 2008, 2015, 2016

International competitions
 UEFA Champions League
  Semi-finalists (2): 2009–10, 2019–20
 UEFA Europa League
  Semi-finalists (1): 2016–17
 UEFA Cup Winners' Cup
  Semi-finalists (1): 1963–64
 UEFA Intertoto Cup
 Winners (1): 1997

References

External links

  
 
 ESPNsoccernet: Olympique Lyonnais

 
Association football clubs established in 1899
Football clubs in Lyon
G-14 clubs
Companies listed on Euronext Paris
1899 establishments in France
Multi-sport clubs in France
L
Ligue 1 clubs
2022 mergers and acquisitions